Afreumenes melanosoma is a species of wasp in the family Vespidae. It was described by Saussure in 1852.

Subspecies
 Afreumenes melanosoma melanosoma (Saussure, 1852)
 Afreumenes melanosoma ealensis Giordani Soika, 1968
 Afreumenes melanosoma yemenensis Giordani Soika, 1996

References

Potter wasps
Insects described in 1852